Block Wars is the second soundtrack album by American rapper the Game. It was released on July 29, 2016, by Blood Money Entertainment and Entertainment One Music. The album features a single guest appearance by singer Lorine Chia. Production was handled by numerous producers including frequent collaborator Bongo.

Background
On May 24, 2016, Game took to his Instagram account to announce the release of his new mobile game with Atari titled "Block Wars". A soundtrack of the same name was developed by Game himself to feature in the app as well as coincide with the app's release. However, the mobile game was never released. It was to feature themes of gang violence and drug trafficking, which is also reflected within the content of the music itself. The soundtrack sold 5,000 copies in pure album sales in its first week of sales.

Track listing

Charts

References

2016 soundtrack albums
The Game (rapper) albums
Albums produced by JellyRoll
Albums produced by Sap (producer)